Brick Store is the colloquial name given to a historic three-unit building in Yarmouth, Maine, United States. Located at 357 Main Street, near its junction with Elm Street in the town's Upper Village, the building was completed in 1862. It has been the home to several business.

History
The building was built by Samuel Fogg and Ansel Loring, with Fogg later occupying part of it with his business, alongside that of Lawrence, Brown & Co. It was completed in 1862, and its early tenants were William Marston's dry goods store (which occupied the site for around a century) and Leone R. Cook's apothecary, where Frank W. Bucknam was an apprentice. For over a century and a half, much of the retail trade in the Upper Village centered around these brick stores.

An American elm, which pre-dated the building by at least forty-five years, stood in front of it for 118 years. It had a bulletin board attached to it, on which were posted public notices "and satirical comments about town affairs." The tree was cut down in 1980, when Dutch elm disease began sweeping through the town.

See also 

 Historical buildings and structures of Yarmouth, Maine

References

Commercial buildings in Yarmouth, Maine
Commercial buildings completed in 1862
1862 establishments in Maine